The Alliance of Concerned Jewish Canadians (ACJC) was formed in 2005 as a coalition of Canadian Jews critical of the policies of the Israeli government, particularly toward the Palestinians. The ACJC argued that Israel wrongly "claim[ed] to speak in the name of Jewish people around the world," and that "those of us who have a different vision" should "come forward publicly to present our views to the Canadian Jewish community and to the people of Canada."

History
In June 2006, the ACJC defended the Canadian Union of Public Employees (CUPE) resolution for a boycott of Israel in disagreement with the condemnation of the trade union by the Canadian Jewish Congress, an umbrella group of various Jewish organizations.  CUPE Ontario president Sid Ryan cited the ACJC's support while defending his union against charges of anti-Semitism.

The ACJC attempted to affiliate with the Canadian Jewish Congress in 2006-07.  Its application was initially rejected in August 2006, with the ACJC's defence of the CUPE resolution on Israel being cited as a reason although the ACJC did not identify with the entire contents of the CUPE resolution. Josh Rotblatt, CJC's director of operations, wrote that "no member organization of CJC can support an economic boycott of the state of Israel, not to mention approving wording which describes the nature of the Israeli state as 'apartheid.' " The decision was reviewed at a subsequent meeting of the CJC's national officers, as the result of an appeal by law professor Michael Mandel acting on behalf of the ACJC.  The CJC once again refused to accept the ACJC's application.

In response to the group's exclusion, ACJC Administrative Secretary Abraham Weizfeld said that the CJC had become dominated by sectarian forces, adding that the "CJC's refusal to include all tendencies in the Jewish community should be seen as a futile attempt to marginalize growing Jewish opposition to Israel's behaviour and to the exclusive character of the Israel State".  Weizfeld also criticized the CJC's June 2007 decision to discontinue the practice of holding direct elections for its board of directors. He noted that 25% of the Board's seats are now reserved for the Canadian Council for Israel and Jewish Advocacy, which he described as providing "unquestioning support to Israel, regardless of what it does".

In his article announcing the formation of Independent Jewish Voices, a group of prominent British Jews in disagreement with the Jewish community leadership's position on Israel, Brian Klug referred to the ACJC as one of several similar Jewish groups internationally "who are confronted with the same climate are taking similar steps to make their voices heard."

The ACJC supported international law, opposed all forms or racism (including anti-Semitism and Islamophobia), and desired to counter the view that any criticism of Israel's government and military policies is automatically racist. Specifically, the ACJC opposed Israeli occupation of the West Bank and Gaza which commenced in 1967.   The Principles adopted at the ACJC conference supported the view that:

"There is no justification for any form of racism, including anti-Semitism, anti-Arab racism or Islamophobia, in any circumstance. The battle against anti-Semitism is vital, and it is undermined whenever opposition to Israeli government policies is automatically branded as anti-Semitic." 

ACJC's founding general principles were:

1. Like Jews everywhere, we, too, are greatly concerned about Israel and the direction it has taken, especially in recent years, but we are also concerned with how the Israel-Palestine conflict is impacting on Jews in Canada.

2. We believe that Israel has a right to exist within the pre-1967 borders, but it should evacuate the Occupied Territories in order to permit the Palestinians to establish a viable, independent, democratic, and just society that can live in peace and harmony with a rejuvenated Israel.

3. We believe that Israeli Jews must learn to live in peaceful and co-operative co-existence with the Palestinians. We will, accordingly, promote groups and programs that support such goals as well as the principle of reconciliation among Jews, Muslims, and Christians.

4. We believe that the Government of Canada should give strong support to the UN and its resolutions and follow an even-handed policy in respect to the Middle East conflict.

5. Our members believe in the future of Jewish communities based in Canada, organized by Canadian Jews, and working in our interests. Though Israel will always be an important concern for us, we do not necessarily approve of all the policies undertaken by Israel. Indeed, we believe that Canadian Jews must be free to state any differences they have with the Israeli government.

6. The ACJC wishes to reclaim the Canadian-Jewish heritage of sympathy to and affiliation with progressive causes.

National Conference

The ACJC organized a national Independent Jewish Canadians Conference on March 28–30, 2008 with Naomi Klein as its keynote speaker . Following a conference, as a result of a split with ACJC co-founder Eibie Weizfeld, a number of people left ACJC and joined with various non-ACJC members to form Independent Jewish Voices (Canada). Weizfeld and his supporters continued as ACJC.

ACJC Criticism of B'Nai Brith Canada on Security Certificates
In 2007, the ACJC sharply criticized Bnai Brith Canada for supporting "security certificates," which are used by the Canadian Federal Government to detain and deport non-citizens without warrants or criminal procedures. Diana Ralph stated that "These days, B'nai Brith seizes every opportunity to come down firmly in opposition to fundamental human rights principles." The ACJC press release, posted on Canadian Dimension, stated that  "It is ironic that B'Nai Brith should defend a law so similar to those Nazis employed against Jews in the name of national security. Hermann Goering's testimony at the Nuremberg war crime trials eerily echoes B'Nai Brith's stand on security certificates."

Support for Norman Finkelstein
In 2007, Weizfeld, as Administrative Secretary of ACJC, protested the controversial denial of tenure by DePaul University to  pro-Palestinian professor Norman Finkelstein. In an email to the President of DePaul, Weizfeld wrote that "Your university has lost a world-class scholar and a much admired teacher in a tenure process tainted by external pressures aiming to shut down academic discussion." The alliance praised Finkelstein, who they stated "distinguished himself as a careful scholar who has, through his widely read and appreciated books, documented and raised important issues regarding Israeli governments' violations of human rights and humanitarian law in Israel and Palestine. We regard this as a service in the cause of creating understanding of human rights issues and promoting the ideas of peace and justice."

References

Further reading
Canadian Jewish News article
True Patriot Love - Jewish Dissent in Canada by ACJC founder Michael Benazon, Outlook, Nov/Dec 2005
Alliance of Concerned Jewish Canadians, The Jewish Grassroots Revolt.  Canadian Dimension. February 19, 2007.

Jewish anti-occupation groups
Non-governmental organizations involved in the Israeli–Palestinian conflict
Political advocacy groups in Canada
Jewish organizations based in Canada